Nathi Muthal Nathi Vare is a 1983 Indian Malayalam-language film directed by Vijayanand and produced by Eeraali. The film stars Mammootty, M. G. Soman, Ratheesh, Lakshmi and Menaka in the lead roles. The film has musical score by Raghu Kumar. It is a remake of 1975 Hindi film Deewaar.

Cast

Mammootty as Raju
Ratheesh as Ravi
Captain Raju as Vishnu 
Lakshmi as Naseema
M. G. Soman as Hamsa
Balan K. Nair as Anwar
Jagathy Sreekumar as Bheeran
Kaviyoor Ponnamma as Lakshmi
Jose Prakash as Thampi
Sankaradi as Velu Mooppan
 Sunanda as Nisha
Shubha as Jayasree
Menaka as Thulasi
Prathapachandran as Sreedhara Menon
P. K. Abraham as R. C. Nair

Soundtrack
The music was composed by Raghu Kumar and the lyrics were written by Chowalloor Krishnankutty.

References

External links
 

1983 films
1980s Malayalam-language films
Malayalam remakes of Hindi films
Films scored by Raghu Kumar